What a Time to Be Alive is a collaborative commercial mixtape by Canadian rapper Drake and American rapper Future. It was released on September 20, 2015, by Young Money Entertainment, Cash Money Records, Republic Records, Epic Records, A1 Records and Freebandz. The mixtape was executive produced by Metro Boomin, who also produced or co-produced eight of its 11 songs. Additional producers include 40 (who also executive produced the mixtape), alongside Southside, Allen Ritter, Boi-1da, Frank Dukes, and others. It was released on the iTunes Store and Apple Music, and debuted at number one on the US Billboard 200.

Background
What a Time to Be Alive was supported by Drake and Future's previous collaboration on the single "Where Ya At". As friends, they originally planned to record a mixtape together earlier in the year; the project never fully materialized. However, during recording sessions for "Where Ya At", the duo began working on the project, beginning in July.

According to a 2016 interview with Zane Lowe, Drake spent 6 days in Atlanta working on the project with Future. "Digital Dash" was the first song they made for the project, presented as a finished piece to Drake prior to him getting on the song. "Jumpman" was the last song the duo created for the project.

Release, packaging and promotion
The mixtape was first teased by a range of sources; including DJ Skee, Angela Yee and Ernest Baker, and this project was officially announced on Drake's Instagram on September 19, 2015, when he revealed the mixtape's release date and cover art.

The artwork is a stock image that was purchased from Shutterstock.

Drake and Future premiered the album on Beats 1 on OVO Sound's "OVO Sound Radio" show on September 20, 2015, and weeks after it was released on the iTunes Store and Apple Music.

The Summer Sixteen Tour by Drake was made to support this mixtape.

Critical reception

What a Time to Be Alive received generally positive reviews from music critics. At Metacritic, which assigns a normalized rating out of 100 to reviews from mainstream publications, the album received an average score of 70, based on 24 reviews. Billboard described Drake and Future's chemistry as expected and said "Future deals with personal demons that he tries, and fails, to drown in drugs; Drake is mostly about insecurities and lesser gravity". Rolling Stone gave the album 3.5 out of 5 stars, attributing the "fresh and spontaneous" feel to the quick production of the album, where "both artists [are] playing off their louder-than-life personalities without overthinking the details". However, Sheldon Pearce in a Pitchfork review suggests that this limited time-frame for making the album is the sonic downfall of the mixtape arguing that the album "wasn't created with the care or the dutiful curation we've come to expect from both artists when solo."

In a mixed review, Sheldon Pearce of Pitchfork criticizes the "decided lack of chemistry between these two", because "they have difficulty sharing the same space" when on the same song. Pearce goes on to highlight how Future's presence, both in content and persona, is much more prevalent than Drake's, where the latter appears to be a "bystander" and "out of his element". Yet, he highlights moments where the collaboration works most effectively. On "Scholarships", Drake "throws Future the perfect alley-oop", "Jumpman" is a banger, and "Diamonds Dancing" is the first track between the two artists that "clicks on all cylinders". Additionally, Pearce lauds the production by Metro Boomin as "glimmering" and hails both rappers when they are able to work on their own and make music in their respective comfort zones in songs like Future's "Jersey" and Drake's "30 for 30 Freestyle".

Complex said about Drake verses; "despite a corny bar here or there, Drake sounds way more energized with much better flows." Entertainment Weekly was disappointed with Drake on the album, quoting "despite a beat by Drake whisperer Noah "40" Shebib, the album-closing "30 For 30 Freestyle" doesn't come near clearing the admittedly high bar Drake has set for himself in 2015."

Commercial performance
What a Time to Be Alive debuted at number one on the US Billboard 200, with 375,000 album-equivalent units; it sold 334,000 copies in its first week, with the remainder of its unit count representing the album's streaming activity and track sales during the tracking week. It became both Drake and Future's second albums to chart at number one on the Billboard 200 in 2015 (If You're Reading This It's Too Late and DS2, respectively). In its second week it sold 65,000 copies. As of January 27, 2016, What a Time to Be Alive has sold 519,000 copies in the United States. On March 15, 2016, the album was certified platinum by the Recording Industry Association of America (RIAA), for combined sales and album-equivalent units of over a million units.

Track listing

Notes
 "30 for 30 Freestyle" features background vocals by Kyle Machado

Personnel
Musicians
 Maneesh – piano, keyboards (tracks 3, 6)

Technical
 Eric Manco – recording (tracks 1–5, 7–9)
 Seth Firkins – recording (track 6)
 James Kang – recording (track 10)
 Miguel Scott – recording assistance (tracks 1–9, 11)
 Noel "Gadget" Campbell – mixing (tracks 1–9, 11)
 Noah "40" Shebib – mixing (tracks 1–9, 11)
 Metro Boomin – mixing (track 10)
 Les Bateman – mixing assistance (tracks 1–9, 11)
 Greg Moffett – mixing assistance (tracks 1–9, 11)
 Harley Arsenault – mixing assistance (tracks 1–9, 11)
 Noel Cadastre – engineering (tracks 1–9, 11)
 Chris Athens – mastering (all tracks)
 Dave Huffman – mastering assistance (all tracks)

Charts

Weekly charts

Year-end charts

Decade-end charts

Certifications

See also
 List of number-one albums of 2015 (Canada)
 List of UK R&B Chart number-one albums of 2015
 List of Billboard 200 number-one albums of 2015
 List of Billboard number-one R&B/Hip-Hop albums of 2015

References

2015 mixtape albums
Drake (musician) albums
Future (rapper) albums
Collaborative albums
Epic Records compilation albums
Cash Money Records compilation albums
Republic Records compilation albums
Young Money Entertainment compilation albums
Albums produced by Allen Ritter
Albums produced by Boi-1da
Albums produced by Frank Dukes
Albums produced by Metro Boomin
Albums produced by Noah "40" Shebib
Albums produced by Southside (record producer)